Shut Up, Little Man! is the title of audio vérité recordings of two argumentative and violent alcoholics, Peter J. Haskett and Raymond Huffman in San Francisco. Bananafish magazine arranged for a commercial release of the tapes in 1992.

The recordings were made by "Eddie Lee Sausage" and "Mitchell D.", who lived in a bright pink apartment building at 237 Steiner Street (dubbed the "Pepto Bismol Palace") in San Francisco's Lower Haight district. Eddie Lee and Mitchell moved into the apartment in 1987, and discovered that their neighbors, Haskett and Huffman, argued nearly constantly, with Peter often shouting "shut up, little man!" at Ray.  Eddie and Mitchell began tape recording the arguments, and distributing copies among their friends. Eddie Lee and Mitchell sometimes goaded Ray and Peter with prank telephone calls.

In 1992, Huffman died of a heart attack brought on by colon cancer, pancreatitis, and alcoholism. Haskett died in 1996 of liver problems due to alcoholism.

Reception

The first Shut Up, Little Man! compact disc was released in early 1993. A number of other volumes were issued later. The recordings quickly gained a cult following, and were adapted into comic books, zines, a theatrical production and the 2002 independent film Shut Yer Dirty Little Mouth, starring Gill Gayle and Glenn Shadix as Ray and Peter, respectively.

The recordings found fame far beyond San Francisco. Lee reports that:

Documentary film
In 2011 a feature documentary called Shut Up Little Man! – An Audio Misadventure was selected for the 2011 Sundance Film Festival as part of the World Documentary section, where it had its world premiere. It was written and directed by Matthew Bate and produced by Sophie Hyde. According to Tony Newton—an on-and-off roommate of Haskett and Huffman—despite the near-constant vitriol and occasional physical violence, Peter and Ray were extremely close friends. They cooked for one another, took care of each other while they were sick, and one would often visit the other during hospital stays.

Popular culture 
 This American Life featured a lengthy segment in episode 7 from its first season, exploring the topic in the context of quitting.
 The band Devo had a side project, the Wipeouters, and on their only album there is a track titled "Shut Up, Little Man" using many samples of Ray and Peter.
 San Francisco indie rock band the Thinking Fellers Union Local 282 sampled Peter and Raymond on their 1991 album "Lovelyville" and their song "Raymond H" appeared on their following album, Mother of All Saints.
 Boston indie rock band Swirlies excerpted a snippet of Peter and Raymond's dialogue on their 1993 album Blonder Tongue Audio Baton.
 Judy Hopps' noisy neighbors in the film Zootopia are inspired by Peter and Raymond.
 An episode of SpongeBob SquarePants, "Banned in Bikini Bottom", features the phrases "you are a nuisance to my community", "…said this ninety times", and "cops, I need you!" In another episode, "Porous Pockets", SpongeBob says, "and I said, go ahead, let’s do it right now! I got too much hair, anyways." referring to what Raymond claims he told the police. In "The Algae's Always Greener", Mr. Krabs says to Plankton "you're just a dirty little man". In episode 17 of Season 5, Spongehenge Patrick says "I wanna watch something decent, like..." which may be a reference to the recording in which Raymond and Peter are arguing about what to watch on TV and Raymond says that exact line.
 Songwriter Red Label Catharsis featured samples of Ray and Peter in the song "Black Label The Old Crow", which relates the dregs of alcoholism, from the 2006 release Chrystie.
 On a commentary track for the animated series Mission Hill, creators Josh Weinstein and Bill Oakley claim that the characters, Gus and Wally, were based on Ray and Peter.

References

External links
 Shut Up Little Man: An Audio Misadventure Documentary Official Site
Shut Yer Dirty Little Mouth (2002) (IMDb)

Comedy albums by American artists
Underground culture
Works about alcoholism
Privacy controversies and disputes
Field recording